Rockefeller's sunbird (Cinnyris rockefelleri) is a species of bird in the family Nectariniidae.

Taxonomy
This species is part of a larger radiation of sunbirds within the genus Cinnyris. Like other members of this genus, it was formerly considered part of the genus Nectarinia.

Distribution and habitat

This species is only known from the Albertine Rift in eastern Democratic Republic of the Congo, where it is found in montane forest between 2000-3300 m in elevation. Sight records of this species exist from Rwanda and Burundi, but these lack documentation and have yet to be confirmed.

Conservation
It is threatened by habitat loss.

References

Rockefeller's sunbird
Rockefeller's sunbird
Rockefeller's sunbird
Taxonomy articles created by Polbot